Ankilimalinike is a rural municipality in Madagascar. It belongs to the district of Toliara II, which is a part of Atsimo-Andrefana Region. The population of the commune was estimated to be approximately 13,000 in 2001 commune census.

Only primary schooling is available. The majority 90% of the population of the commune are farmers, while an additional 5% receives their livelihood from raising livestock. The most important crops are cassava and cotton, while other important agricultural products are sugarcane and maize.  Services provide employment for 5% of the population.

References

Populated places in Atsimo-Andrefana